The 2000 Brown Bears football team was an American football team that represented Brown University during the 2000 NCAA Division I-AA football season. Brown was declared ineligible for the Ivy League championship, though its league record would have placed it in a tie for third. 

In their third season under head coach Phil Estes, the Bears compiled a 7–3 record and outscored opponents 375 to 301. Gordon Chen, N. Finneran and Drew Inzer were the team captains. 

Before the season began, the Council of Ivy Group Presidents voted to exclude Brown from the football championship for one year in response to a report that Brown basketball, football, soccer and volleyball coaches had connected prospective student-athletes with offers of private financial assistance. The NCAA ruled that the students implicated in the report were not at fault and would retain their eligibility, but the Ivy League, with its stricter rules about financial aid, chose a harsher penalty to send a message to Brown and other member schools that recruiting violations would not be tolerated. Football and the other three Brown teams were also hit with tighter restrictions on recruiting activities for 2001 and 2002.

The Bears' 4–3 conference record in 2000 would have tied for third in the Ivy League standings, but because the team was declared ineligible, the league's record book lists it as the last-place team. Brown outscored Ivy opponents 266 to 245. 

Brown played its home games at Brown Stadium in Providence, Rhode Island.

Schedule

References

Brown
Brown Bears football seasons
Brown Bears football